Ren Michael Pedersen OAM (born "Rene") 4 February 1971, Atherton, North Queensland, Australia), is a prominent international advocate for children's brain cancer research.

After the death of his daughter Amy from a brain stem cancer known as Diffuse Intrinsic Pontine Glioma (DIPG), Pedersen founded the independent Australian arm of The Cure Starts Now.

In 2012 and 2017, Pedersen was nominated for Australian of the Year award in recognition of his efforts to fund research into holistic cancer cures, via targeting the most challenging paediatric brain tumours. He was awarded the Rotary International Harris Medal in 2012, Lauren Hill Full Court Press Award in 2017 and Pride of Australia Medal in 2018.

Pedersen was awarded an Order of Australia Medal in the 2022 Australia Day Honours for service to the community.

Early life 
His family were direct descendants of pioneering convict settlers, John Warby and Sarah Bently. He is the first born of Ken and Marie (née McMahon) Pedersen. His family owned Australia's second oldest continually operating hotel, The Royal Hotel, in Herberton, North Queensland. In 1975, following a marriage breakdown, Marie moved to Atherton with her two sons.

The family relocated to Ayr, North Queensland in 1978, where Pedersen completed school at St Francis primary school and later, Ayr High.

Career 
After successfully completing Senior, Pedersen left home and became a qualified Horticulturalist with the Burdekin Shire Council. Moving to Townsville around 1990, Pedersen started a small landscape gardening business, before accepting an offer to experience professional rugby league with the Canterbury Bulldogs, then Wests, soon after.

Upon arrival in Sydney in early February 1992, Pedersen also trialled for the Randwick Rugby Union club under the pseudonym of "John Keller", and was graded after scoring four tries in a single game during an Open club trial. The offer to play rugby union was declined.

After serious knee and facial injuries and major operations in 1992 and 1993, Pedersen was convinced to re-establish first grade credentials with the NRL feeder club Newtown Jets. Although attaining solid employment in Sydney at Port Botany Container Depot, Pedersen returned to Townsville by 1994, disillusioned with sitting in the stands from injury and fed up with "city life".

After immediately gaining employment as a stevedore in Townsville, Pedersen played centre in University's unsuccessful Grand Final tilt on 18 September 1994. Pedersen credits his greatest achievement in rugby league as making two complete sets of six tackles in a single game against the Burdekin, earlier that same season. He retired from league soon after, but made a few, uninspiring attempts to rekindle past glories, eventually making "A" Grade with Teachers Wests Rugby Union and University Rugby League sides in the early 2000s.

Ceasing employment at the port in 2004, Patriot Crane Hire was formed in 2005.

He has three children, oldest Jack born in 1997 and Riley in 2012. The legacy of middle daughter, Amy Pedersen (2000–2009), has inspired a nation. His passion for promoting positive health pathways for children is firmly recognised across Australia's media landscape. A prominent social angler, he is heavily involved in the fishing sector and is a regular contributor to FM radio's North Queensland Fishing Show.

Following the death of his daughter, Pedersen formed The Cure Starts Now (Australia) in efforts to honour a promise to Amy that he "Would never give up!" and give future brain tumour children, both in Australia and internationally, a shot at life.

Charity work 
The Cure Starts Now was founded in 2007 by Cincinnati's Keith and Brooke Desserich with Ren Pedersen the former director of the independent Australian branch of this astounding international organization.

Ren Pedersen is universally acknowledged for 'fathering' Australia's DIPG movement.

 March 2009 – The Cure Starts Now (Australia) established by Pedersen.
 June 2009 – Board and formal structures implemented. The Cure Starts Now (Inc) becomes official DGR Registered Australian charity (Incorporation #IA37656)
 2010 – After intense lobbying, the most dreaded term in all fields of cancer, "Diffuse Intrinsic Pontine Glioma"/DIPG, is recognised in its own right as a distinct ailment in Australian medical institutions. Previously, DIPG was merely classified as a "Miscellaneous CNS Tumour".
 2011 – $100K revolutionary "Robotic Screening Technology" Grant approved for The Children's Cancer Institute of Australia.
 2011 – Founding member of the DIPG Collaborative.
 2011 – National DIPG Autopsy Donation protocols implemented across major Australian hospitals
 2012 – He was nominated for Australian Of The Year and Pride of Australia awards.
 2012 – Pedersen awarded Rotary's Paul Harris Fellowship Award.
 January 2013 – $100,000 "PANEO Drug Protocol" Grant to CCIA
 May 2013 – Australian DIPG researchers showcased for first time at esteemed international DIPG Symposium in Chicago
 November 2013 – $109,000 Monash Institute of Medical Research Grant to fund "Targeted Drug and Stem Cell Therapy" trials
 2014 – National Registry implemented, fusing autopsy and clinical data from all major Australian hospitals.
 2014 – The Cure Starts Now internationally recognised and featured at world's most prestigious cancer conference, ISPNO in Singapore.
 2014 – Musically inept Pedersen plays piano at Australian High Commissioner's Residence in Singapore.
 March 2015 – $103,615 "F.A.C.T/CBL1037" Grant to Children's Cancer Institute of Australia (CCIA) equating to the largest private DIPG donation in Australian history, at the time 
 October 2015 – $190,000 CCIA "Feretinide" Grant 
 February 2016 – The Cure Starts Now (Australia) implements national Monkey In My Chair program.
 October 2016 – $180,000 provided to CCIA through the "DCA" Grant.
 December 2016 - CCIA "Benefactors Award" presented to The Cure Starts Now at Government House, Sydney, Australia.
 January 2017 - Pedersen nominated for "Australian Of The Year".
 May 2017 – Pedersen awarded "Lauren Hill Full Court Press Award" in Cincinnati, USA.
 June 2017 – Australia's Monkey In My Chair Co-Ordinator, Di Marthick, announces full implementation of this amazing scheme across the nation.
 October 2017 – National Media Event: upon arrival by helicopter, $236K cheque awarded to CCIA's Dr Laura Franshaw on behalf of DIPG Collaborative for "PCK1" Grant. By far, the largest private DIPG research donation in Australian history.
 February 2018 – He addresses international DIPG Collaborative conference in Washington DC.
 February, 2018 - Director of The Cure Starts Now (Australia) awarded Pride of Australia Medal  for achievements toward eradicating "The Deadliest Cancer Known To Man".
 March 2018 – Pedersen officially announces Sydney's hosting of the 2019 international DIPG Symposium, potentially one of the most important gatherings in Australian medical history.
 August 1, 2019 - International DIPG Symposium  held in Sydney, regarded as potentially one of the most important medical conferences ever held upon Australian shores:
 August 22, 2019 - WA Telethon Institute's Prof. Terry Johns awarded $73464.25 "Ion Channel Inhibition" grant.
 November 2019 - The DIPG Collaborative presented a research grant cheque for $146,298.29 to Dr Han Shen at the Westmead Institute for Medical Research.
 December 2019 - The Cure Starts Now Australia donated $151,468 to Sydney Children's Hospital to develop new epigenetic combination treatments against DIPG.
 September 2020 - Hunter Institute of Medical Research's "COMBATT/Paxalisib" project commenced @ $203 522.00 
 October 2020 - Children's Cancer Institute's "Epigenetic Players" initiative started @ $150 379.00 
 February 2021 - Esteemed scientific publication NATURE COMMUNICATIONS announces stunning new results from CSN's seed funding of the CCI's exciting DFMO/AMXT1501 research project.
 15 April 2021 - Stunning new clinical trial announced, stemming from CSN's 2015 FACT/CBL0137 Grant.
6 October 2021 - $136,561.00 donated to  Dr. Laura Genovesi  for  research into “Innovative Models of the Brain Microenvironment to Identify New Treatments for Medulloblastoma”.
10 October 2021 - $266 741.00 donated to Dr. David Ziegler of Sydney Children’s Hospital for research into “Phase I/II Study of Oral DFMO + AMXT1501 for DIPG/DMG”.
10 October 2021 - $68 280.00 donated to Dr. Danielle Upton of the Children’s Cancer Institute for research into “Developing Novel Combination Therapies for DIPG”.
24-25 March 2022 - Inaugural National Children`s Brain Cancer Conference co-hosted by The Cure Starts Now, uniting scores of Australia`s leading paediatric oncologists, scientists, nuerosurgeons and researchers for the first time in Brisbane, Queensland.

To date approximately $5 million has been directly raised by Pedersen and The Cure Starts Now (Australia)  for DIPG brain tumour research, since 2009 inception 

Additionally, Pedersen has indirectly assisted in acquiring an additional $7.5m (approx.) worth of Australian DIPG/BT research funding via alternate funding streams, i.e. CCIA, NHMRC Grants, etc.

Collective pooling of resources and processes has realized around $21m worth of new international DIPG/BT research via the DIPG Collaborative, of which The Cure Starts Now (Australia) is a Foundational Member.

He sat upon the Cure Starts Now's internationally acclaimed Strategic Advisory Council, which has overseen the approval of approximately $25M AUD worth of new BT/DIPG research projects in the past decade.

Ren is no longer formally aligned with any charitable enterprise.

References

External links
 thecurestartsnow.org.au
 DIPG: The Diffuse Intrinsic Pontine Glioma Resource Network
 Notes Left Behind

Australian health activists
1971 births
Living people